Cauchas canalella is a moth of the  family Adelidae. It is found in Russia.

References

Moths described in 1844
Adelidae
Moths of Europe